The women's 500 metres in short track speed skating at the 1998 Winter Olympics took place on 19 February at the White Ring. It featured an uncommon occurrence, as two finalists failed to finish (one was disqualified), meaning that the winner of the B Final, Chun Lee-kyung, won a bronze medal. A consequence of this is that Chun actually recorded a faster time in the final than the two women who won medals ahead of her.

Results

Heats
The first round was held on 19 February. There were eight heats, with the top two finishers moving on to the quarterfinals.

Heat 1

Heat 2

Heat 3

Heat 4

Heat 5

Heat 6

Heat 7

Heat 8

Quarterfinals
The top two finishers in each of the four quarterfinals advanced to the semifinals. In quarterfinal 2, Japan's Chikage Tanaka was advanced, and North Korea's Jong Ok-myong disqualified. In quarterfinal 3, Japan's Ikue Teshigawara was advanced and Bulgaria's Evgeniya Radanova disqualified.

Quarterfinal 1

Quarterfinal 2

Quarterfinal 3

Quarterfinal 4

Semifinals
The top two finishers in each of the two semifinals qualified for the A final, while the third and fourth place skaters advanced to the B Final.

Semifinal 1

Semifinal 2

Finals
The four qualifying skaters competed in Final A, while four others raced for 5th place in Final B. The disqualification of Isabelle Charest and Wang Chunlu's failure to finish resulted in 

Final A

Final B

References

Women's short track speed skating at the 1998 Winter Olympics
Women's events at the 1998 Winter Olympics